Zahrah Mary Chassib Jaber, born 19 August 1924 – 9 October 2016), better known by her stage name Zara Nutley, was an English actress. She is best known for her roles in two television comedy series, Mind Your Language (as college principal Miss Courtney) and Never the Twain (as Aunt Eleanor).

Biography
Nutley was born in Cornwall in 1924, the daughter of Stanley Jaber and Gladys Gregory, who married in 1923.

Early in her career she was involved in amateur stage productions and subsequently repertory theatre. In the 1950s she studied and later taught at the Florence Moore Drama Studio in Hove, Sussex. Prior to 1977, she was variously billed as Zahrah, Zarah, or Zara Jaber.

In the television sitcom Mind Your Language (1977–1979 and 1986), Nutley played Dolores Courtney, the principal of an adult education college. Her character was scripted as a stern, authoritarian feminist and spinster who was detested and feared by the staff and students at the school. Her other regular television role was the final three seasons of Never the Twain (1981–1991), in which she played Donald Sinden's Aunt Eleanor.

Nutley died aged 92 in Uckfield, East Sussex, on 9 October 2016.

Filmography

Notes

References

External links

Zara Nutley (Aveleyman)

1924 births
2016 deaths
British television actresses
People from Falmouth, Cornwall
Actresses from Cornwall
20th-century British actresses
20th-century English women
20th-century English people